Events from the 1480s in England. This decade marks the beginning of the Tudor period.

Incumbents
 Monarch – Edward IV (until 9 April 1483), Edward V (9 April to 26 June 1483), Richard III (26 June 1483 to 22 August 1485), then Henry VII 
 Regent – Richard, Duke of Gloucester (starting 30 April, until 26 June 1483)
 Parliament – 6th of King Edward IV (starting 20 January, until 18 February 1483), King Richard III (starting 23 January, until 20 February 1484), 1st of King Henry VII (starting 7 November 1485, until c. 4 March 1486), 2nd of King Henry VII (starting 9 November, until c. 18 December 1487), 3rd of King Henry VII (starting 13 January 1489)

Events
 1480
 1 August – Treaty of Perpetual Friendship between England and Burgundy.
 Magdalen College School, Oxford, established by William Waynflete.
 1481
William Caxton publishes The Historie of Reynart the Foxe, the first English edition of the tale, and also his 1480 translation of Mirrour of the Worlde, the first book printed in England to include woodcut illustrations.
 1481 or 1482 – Thomas de Littleton's Treatise on Tenures published posthumously, the first ever printed text on English law.
 1482
 June – Richard, Duke of Gloucester invades Scotland and captures Edinburgh.
 24 August – capture of Berwick: Scots surrender Berwick-upon-Tweed to Richard, ending his campaign; the town remains permanently English hereafter.
 Act concerning Swans sets out that swans are the property of the monarch (or those given permission by him to own them).
 1483
 January – Act of Apparel, a sumptuary law, is passed.
 9 April – following the death of Edward IV, the 12-year-old Edward V becomes king with his uncle the Duke of Gloucester acting as Lord Protector.
 13 June – summary execution at the Tower of London of William Hastings, 1st Baron Hastings for allegedly conspiring against the new Protector's life.
 26 June – Richard becomes Richard III after Edward V is declared to be illegitimate by Parliament.
 6 July – coronation of Richard III at Westminster Abbey following a procession on the Thames.
 Late Summer – disappearance of the Princes in the Tower, Edward V and Richard of Shrewsbury, 1st Duke of York.
 8 September – Edward of Middleham is invested as Prince of Wales by his father the king at the Archbishop's Palace in York.
 October – a rebellion by Henry Stafford, 2nd Duke of Buckingham is crushed by Richard III.
 2 November – Henry Stafford executed at Salisbury.
 William Caxton publishes his English translation of the Golden Legend, his most popular publication.
 1484
 January – Parliament passes the act Titulus Regius.
 2 March – a royal charter is granted to the College of Arms, the official English heraldic authority, established in London.
 26 March – William Caxton publishes his English translation of Aesop's Fables.
 July – Richard III establishes a judicial Council of the North.
 21 September – Treaty of Nottingham: three-year truce between England and Scotland signed.
 1485
 31 July – Thomas Malory's 1470 book Le Morte d'Arthur published by Caxton.
 August – start of serious outbreak of sweating sickness.
 22 August
Wars of the Roses: Battle of Bosworth Field is fought between the armies of King Richard III and rival claimant to the throne Henry Tudor, Earl of Richmond. Richard dies in battle and Henry becomes King Henry VII of England, ending the Middle Ages in England and beginning of the Tudor dynasty.
 Creation of the Yeomen of the Guard.
 30 October – coronation of Henry VII at Westminster Abbey.
 1486
 18 January – marriage of Henry VII and Elizabeth of York uniting the House of Lancaster and the House of York.
 April – Henry defeats the Stafford and Lovell Rebellion.
 20 September – birth of Henry VII and Elizabeth of York's eldest son Arthur at Winchester.
 6 October – John Morton enthroned as Archbishop of Canterbury.
 The Book of Saint Albans is published.
 First recorded use of the word 'football' to describe a game in which the ball is kicked.
 1487
 24 May – Lambert Simnel is crowned King "Edward VI of England" in Christchurch Cathedral, Dublin, Ireland. He claims to be Edward, Earl of Warwick and on 5 June lands in Furness with an army to challenge Henry VII for the throne.
 16 June – Wars of the Roses: at the Battle of Stoke Field, the final battle of the conflict, the rebellion of pretender Lambert Simnel, led by John de la Pole, Earl of Lincoln and Francis Lovell, 1st Viscount Lovell, is crushed by troops loyal to Henry VII.
 25 November – coronation of Elizabeth of York as Queen consort of England.
 1488
 The price of knitted woollen hats is fixed by law.
 1489
 14 February – Treaty of Redon: England allies with Brittany against France.
 26 March – the Treaty of Medina del Campo between England and Spain includes provision for a marriage between Arthur, the son of King Henry VII, and Princess Catherine of Aragon.
 28 April – Henry Percy, Earl of Northumberland murdered by protesters against new war tax; revolt quickly suppressed.
 13 June – Battle of Dixmude: Anglo-Habsburg victory over France.
 29 November – Arthur Tudor is named Prince of Wales.
 The Gold Sovereign is first issued.
 King Henry VII gives a city charter to Southwold.

Births
 1482
 Richard Pace, diplomat (died 1536)
 1483
 Thomas Parr, alleged oldest living man (died 1635)
 1485
 Hugh Aston, composer (died 1558)
 Thomas Cromwell, 1st Earl of Essex, statesman (executed 1540)
 John Russell, 1st Earl of Bedford, royal minister (died 1555)
 1486
 20 September – Arthur, Prince of Wales, son of Henry VII of England (died 1502)
 1487
 Hugh Latimer, Protestant bishop (martyred 1555)
 1488
Thomas Audley, 1st Baron Audley of Walden, Lord Chancellor (died 1544)
 Myles Coverdale, Bible translator (died 1568)
 1489
 2 July – Thomas Cranmer, Protestant Archbishop of Canterbury (martyred 1556)

Deaths
 1481
 23 August – Thomas de Littleton, judge and legal author (born c. 1407)
 19 November – Anne de Mowbray, 8th Countess of Norfolk (born 1472)
 Mary Woodville, noblewoman (born c. 1454)
 1482
 25 August – Margaret of Anjou, exiled queen consort of Henry VI (born 1430)
 Approximate date – William Worcester, topographer, antiquary and chronicler (born 1415)
 1483
 4 April – Henry Bourchier, 1st Earl of Essex (born c. 1405)
 9 April – King Edward IV of England (born 1442)
 June – William Hastings, 1st Baron Hastings (executed) (born 1431)
 13 June – Richard Grey, half brother of Edward V of England (executed) (born 1458)
 25 June – Anthony Woodville, 2nd Earl Rivers (executed) (born 1442)
 2 November – Henry Stafford, 2nd Duke of Buckingham, politician (born 1454)
George Nevill, Duke of Bedford (born 1457)
 Edmund Sutton, nobleman (born 1425)
 1484
 9 April – Edward of Middleham, Prince of Wales (born c. 1473)
 2 October – Isabel of Cambridge, Countess of Essex (born 1409)
 1485
 16 March – Anne Neville, queen of Richard III of England (born 1456)
 22 August (killed at the Battle of Bosworth Field)
 King Richard III of England (born 1452)
 Robert Brackenbury courtier to Richard III (year of birth unknown)
 William Brandon, supporter of Henry VII (born 1426)
 John Howard, 1st Duke of Norfolk (born 1430)
 Richard Ratcliffe, supporter of Richard III (year of birth unknown)
 August – William Catesby, supporter of Richard III (executed) (born 1450)
 17 October – John Scott of Scott's Hall, Warden of the Cinque Ports (born c. 1423)
 1486
 30 March – Thomas Bourchier, Archbishop of Canterbury and Lord Chancellor of England (born c. 1404)
 11 May – William Waynflete, Lord Chancellor and bishop of Winchester (born c. 1398)
 19 September – Richard Oldham, cleric (year of birth unknown)
 1487
 16 June – John de la Pole, Earl of Lincoln (born c. 1463)
 30 September – John Sutton, 1st Baron Dudley, Lord Lieutenant of Ireland (born 1400)
William FitzAlan, 16th Earl of Arundel (born 1417)
 1489
 28 April – Henry Percy, Earl of Northumberland (born c. 1449)

References